Zoe Stark is an Australian actress who played Sheena Wilson in the Australian soap opera Neighbours, in 2000, 2001, 2002, 2003, 2005 and 2006. Stark also appeared in two episodes of Blue Heelers (Too Good to Be True: Part 1 & 2) as Katya in 2003.

External links
 

Living people
Year of birth missing (living people)
Australian soap opera actresses
Place of birth missing (living people)